Prajna Chowta (born in 1970, Accra, Ghana) is an Indian conservationist, wildlife researcher, writer and filmmaker specialised in the Asian elephant. She is the co-founder and managing trustee of the Aane Mane Foundation, founded in Bangalore, India, in 2000.

Studies and research
Prajna Chowta graduated in 1993 from the School of Oriental and African Studies SOAS, University of London, with a Masters in anthropology.
She spent the last two decades in elephant camps and communities of mahouts in south and north-east India and is one of the rare women mahouts in Asia. Since 1995, she has focused on the migration of Asian elephants on the Indo-Myanmar(Burma) border; the communities and traditional techniques of mahouts in India and Burma; and the management of elephants in their natural habitat.
Since 2011, she developed ElephanTTrackinG, a remote monitoring system for elephants using GPS collars currently deployed in India, Bhutan, Thailand. Prajna Chowta has recently been researching the history of the Andaman elephants.

Early life
Prajna Chowta was born in Ghana, grew up in Nigeria and later in Bombay and Bangalore, India. She is the daughter of D. K. Chowta, a Kannada author and businessman, and the sister of music director Sandeep Chowta.

Awards
In 2016, Prajna Chowta was made Chevalier de l'Ordre National du Mérite (Knight in the National Order of Merit), by the President of the French Republic.

Publications
 Chowta P., Gautier P. (2000) Hathi, l'éléphant (French) Published by Les 400 Coups, Montreal, Canada 
 Chowta P. (2000) The Old Elephant Route, A Research on Elephant Migration between Myanmar and India, Asian Elephant Conservation Fund Report, Fish & Wildlife Service, Washington D.C., USA
 Chowta P. (2010) Elephant Code Book, revised by S.S. Bist, R. Sukumar, B.C. Chittiappa, published by Asian Nature Conservation Foundation & Aane Mane Foundation, Bangalore, India 
 Chowta P., Ledoux S. (2014) Enfant d'Eléphants (French), published by Elytis Editions, France. 
 Chowta P. (2016) A Brief History of the Andaman Elephants, Aane Mane Foundation, India.
 Chowta P. (2022) Cultural Aberrations in the Management of Captive Elephants in The SOAS Elephant Reader, edited by Ed Emery, SOAS, London, UK. ISBN 978-0-906305-16-4

Filmography

 Hathi (1998) directed by Philippe Gautier, written by Prajna Chowta and Philippe Gautier, produced by Rock Demers, Les Productions La Fête, Montréal, Québec, Canada
 The Old Elephant Route (2000) directed by Philippe Gautier, written by Prajna Chowta and Philippe Gautier, produced by Les Films d'Ici (Paris) & GA&A (Rome), Discovery Channel, USA.
 Elephas Maximus (2005) documentary trilogy directed by Philippe Gautier, written by Prajna Chowta and Philippe Gautier, Produced by Les Films d'Ici & 24images, Arte Television, France.
Episode 1: Of Elephants and Men
Episode 2: Meetings with Remarkable Animals
Episode 3: God and the Elephant

 Elephant Blues (2014) directed by Philippe Gautier, written by Prajna Chowta and Philippe Gautier, produced by 24images & Les Films d'Ici, France. Distributed by DigiNext, New York City.

References

External links
 Official website
 

1970 births
Living people
Alumni of SOAS University of London
Indian writers
Knights of the Ordre national du Mérite